"Wild Man" is a song written by Susan Longacre and Rick Giles, and recorded by American country music singer Ricky Van Shelton. It was released in October 1992 as the second single from his compilation album Greatest Hits Plus.  The song spent twenty weeks on the Hot Country Singles & Tracks charts, where it peaked at number 5. It was his last Top Ten hit on the country music charts.

Chart performance

Year-end charts

References

1992 singles
Ricky Van Shelton songs
Song recordings produced by Steve Buckingham (record producer)
Music videos directed by Deaton-Flanigen Productions
Columbia Nashville Records singles
Songs written by Rick Giles
Songs written by Susan Longacre
1992 songs